Sun Tzu: War on Business (literally: "Master Sun — War on Business") was a Singaporean reality television series broadcast by Channel NewsAsia and distributed by BBC Worldwide. In the show presenter James Sun traveled around the world helping entrepreneurs and their businesses to achieve their goals using the principles of The Art of War. The series premiered in March 2010 and last aired in 2011.

International distribution
The show aired in the US on the National Geographic Channel in March 2010.

References

Series
2000s Singaporean television series
2010 Singaporean television series debuts
Sun Tzu
CNA (TV network) original programming